Diancta crookshanksi is a species of land snail, a gastropoda mollusk in the family Diplommatinidae.

Distribution
This marine species occurs off the Philippines.

References

Diplommatinidae
Gastropods described in 2014